TR2 may refer to:

 C++ Technical Report 2, a document proposing additions to the C++ Standard Library after Technical Report 1
 Tomb Raider II, a video game
 Theatre Royal 2, a drama productions studio, part of Theatre Royal, Plymouth
 Triumph TR2, a sports car from the British Triumph Motor Company
 a Tr2 2-10-0 steam locomotive (decapod) built in the USA, but operated in Finland
 TR-2, a variant of the Grumman American AA-1
 TR.2, a variant of the Hitachi TR.1
 TR.2, see Orenda Engines
 TR2, a postal district in the TR postcode area
 TAS1R2, a taste receptor
 Temple Run 2
 Westinghouse TR-2 research reactor operated in the 1960s